Vadamarachchi Hindu Girls' College ( Vaṭamarāṭci Intu Makaḷir Kallūri) is a provincial school in Point Pedro, Sri Lanka.

See also
 List of schools in Northern Province, Sri Lanka

References

External links
 Vadamarachchi Hindu Girls' College

Girls' schools in Sri Lanka
Provincial schools in Sri Lanka
Schools in Point Pedro